Gotlands nation is one of the 13 student nations at Uppsala University. It is named for the island of Gotland, where most of its students come from.

The nation is primarily known for its Lambskallegasque; An annual dinner where gratinated lambs head is served as the main course. Gotlands is one of the smallest of Uppsala's nations, rarely going above 800 members. It is also notably the only nation in Uppsala with its nation building on the east side of the River fyris.

The nation was formed in 1681 and was the nation of Betty Pettersson (1838-1885), the first female student at a Swedish university, after whom Gotlands names its pub.

Inspektors 
 Gotlands nation

Nations at Uppsala University
Student organizations established in the 17th century